Louis Situwuka Shotridge (April 15, 1883 – August 6, 1937) was an American art collector and ethnological assistant who was an expert on the traditions of his people, the Tlingit nation of southeastern Alaska.  His Tlingit name was Stoowukháa, which means "Astute One."

Early life
Louis Shotridge was born at Klukwan, Alaska, near present-day Haines, in 1883, to George Shotridge (birth name Yeilgooxu, also spelled as Yeil gooxhu) and Kudeit.sáakw.  In the Tlingit matrilineal system, Louis followed his mother as a member of the Kaagwaantaan clan in the Eagle moiety and as a member of the Gaaw Hit (Drum House) offshoot called Ligooshi Hit (Finned House).  Louis was named after a (Presbyterian) missionary in Haines, Louis Paul.  The name Shotridge is derived from Louis' paternal grandfather Chief "Tschartitsch," this being a Germanicized spelling of the Tlingit name "kakolah" or, in contemporary Tlingit orthography, Shaadbaxhícht.

Marriage

Shotridge was educated at the Haines mission school, where he met his wife-to-be, Florence Dennis (Kaatkwaaxsnéi, also spelled as Katwachsnea), whom he married in a traditional Tlingit arranged marriage; she was of the Lukaax.ádi clan.  Florence became an accomplished weaver of baskets and Chilkat blankets and performed her technique at the Lewis and Clark Centennial Exposition in Portland, Oregon, in 1905.  Perhaps inspired by contact with the ethnologist Lt. G. T. Emmons, Louis accompanied Florence to Portland to exhibit and sell Tlingit artifacts from Klukwan.  Forty-nine were sold to George Byron Gordon of the University of Pennsylvania Museum of Archaeology and Anthropology in Philadelphia, who subsequently hired him to collect more, thus beginning a lifelong career for the Shotridges as artifact collectors, art producers, and culture-brokers.

Work in anthropology

In 1912 the Shotridges visited Philadelphia and met the anthropologist Frank Speck, who introduced them to Canada's leading anthropologist-linguist, Edward Sapir.  They began to work with Sapir as well, providing him with essays, information, and objects.

In 1914 the Shotridges met Franz Boas in New York and worked with him on recording information on Tlingit language and musicology.  Boas included Louis in his lecture audiences and eventually in his weekly round-table discussions among anthropologists at Columbia University.

Starting in 1915, Shotridge worked for 17 years as Assistant Curator at the University Museum, making him the first Northwest Coast Indian to be employed by a museum.

Louis was also active in the Alaska Native Brotherhood and served as its Grand President.

Florence died on June 12, 1917, of tuberculosis and was buried at Chilkoot, Alaska.

In February 1919 Louis remarried, to Elizabeth Cook, a Tlingit of the L'uknax.ádi clan, and they had three children: Louis Jr., Richard, and Lillian.  Elizabeth died in August 1928 of tuberculosis.  In the early 1930s Louis married again, to Mary Kasakan (Kaakaltin), a Tlingit of Sitka, Alaska of the Kiks.ádi clan from the family of "Chief Katlean", and had two more children by her.

Shotridge died August 6, 1937, of complications from an accident.

References

 Berman, Judith (2004) "'Some Mysterious Means of Fortune': A Look at North Pacific Coast Oral History."  In: Coming to Shore: Northwest Coast Ethnology, Traditions, and Visions, ed. by Marie Mauzé, Michael E. Harkin, and Sergei Kan, pp. 129–162.  Lincoln: University of Nebraska Press.
 Boas, Franz (1917) Grammatical Notes on the Language of the Tlingit Indians.  Philadelphia: University Museum.
 Dean, Jonathan (1998) "Louis Shotridge, Museum Man: A 1918 Visit to the Nass and Skeena Rivers."  Pacific Northwest Quarterly, vol. 89, no. 4, pp. 202–210.
 Milburn, Maureen E. (1986) "Louis Shotridge and the Objects of Everlasting Esteem."  In: Raven's Journey, ed. by Susan Kaplan and Kristin J. Barsness, pp. 54–90.  Philadelphia: University of Pennsylvania Press.
 Milburn, Maureen E. (1994) "Weaving the 'Tina' Blanket: The Journey of Florence and Louis Shotridge."  In: Haa Kusteeyí, Our Culture: Tlingit Life Stories, ed. by Nora Marks Dauenhauer and Richard Dauenhauer, pp. 548–564.  (Classics of Tlingit Oral Literature, vol. 3.)  Seattle: University of Washington Press.
 Shotridge, Florence (1913) "The Life of a Chilkat Indian Girl."  Museum Journal (University of Pennsylvania Museum), vol. 4, pp. 101–103.
 Shotridge, Florence, and Louis Shotridge (1913) "Indians of the Northwest."  Museum Journal, vol. 4, pp. 71–80.
 Shotridge, Florence, and Louis Shotridge (1913) "Chilkat Houses."  Museum Journal, vol. 4, pp. 81–100.
 Shotridge, Louis (1917) "My Northland Revisited."  Museum Journal, vol. 8, pp. 105–115.
 Shotridge, Louis (1919) "War Helmets and Clan Hats of the Tlingit Indians."  Museum Journal, vol. 10, pp. 43–48.
 Shotridge, Louis (1919) "A Visit to the Tsimshian Indians."  Museum Journal, vol. 10, pp. 49–67, 117–148.
 Shotridge, Louis (1920) "Ghost of Courageous Adventurer."  Museum Journal, vol. 11, pp. 11–26.
 Shotridge, Louis (1928) "The Emblems of Tlingit Culture."  Museum Journal, vol. 19, pp. 350–377.
 Shotridge, Louis (1929) "The Kaguanton Shark Helmet."  Museum Journal, vol. 20, pp. 339–343.

External links

Louis Shotridge Digital Archive at the Penn Museum

1883 births
1937 deaths
20th-century American anthropologists
20th-century Native Americans
Accidental deaths in Alaska
Alaska Native people
American ethnologists
Native American anthropologists
People from Haines Borough, Alaska
Tlingit people
University of Pennsylvania Museum of Archaeology and Anthropology
Writers from Alaska
American Folklorists of Color